Basil Totman (1874 – 2 March 1953) was a New Zealand cricketer. He played one first-class match for Auckland in 1897/98.

See also
 List of Auckland representative cricketers

References

External links
 

1874 births
1953 deaths
New Zealand cricketers
Auckland cricketers
Sportspeople from Essex
People from Finchingfield
British emigrants to New Zealand